The 1988 Supercopa Libertadores was the inaugural year of the competition. The tournament was open to all the past winners of the Copa Libertadores. It commenced on 10 February and concluded on 18 June. A total of 13 football clubs entered the first round draw.

It was won by Argentinian side Racing over Brazilian side Cruzeiro 3–2 on aggregate after a two-legged final. The tournament's top scorer was Sergio Oliveira of Nacional and Antonio Alzamendi of River Plate with 4 goals each.

Qualified teams
Up until the beginning of 1988, thirteen teams had won the Copa Libertadores at least once since its inaugural season in 1960.

Knockout bracket

* Although Racing and Santos FC played in a first round tie, their series was placed in the quarterfinals due to the winner Racing getting a bye to the semifinal.

First stage
The matches were played from 10 February to 20 April. Teams from the same nation could not be drawn against one another.

|}
Nacional received a bye to the quarter-finals.

Quarter-finals
The matches were played from 28 April to 18 May. Racing Club received a bye into the next round.

|}
Racing received a bye to the semi-finals.

Semi-finals
The matches were played from 25 May to 3 June.

|}

Finals

See also
1988 Copa Libertadores
1989 Recopa Sudamericana

Footnotes

External links
RSSSF

Supercopa Libertadores
2